Laguna de Aculeo is since 2018 a dried-out lake located in the city of Paine, Maipo Province, Santiago Metropolitan Region, Chile. It featured muddy banks and is surrounded by gently tilting ground. The lake's bottom is largely impermeable limiting its connection to underground aquifers. It classifies as a sediment-dammed lake.

The drying of lake is the result of below-average rainfall over the past decade and also because of human activity which are diverting rivers and pumping groundwater from aquifers, which both had replenished the lake.

History 
The lake obtained its name from the Mapuche term Acum-Leu, meaning "where the river ends". Local folklore tells of a treasure, an entierro, that is hidden in the mud of the bottom of the lake since 1814.

Once a main tourist destination for individuals in Santiago, the lake featured a popular floating bar in the 1990s.

According to García-Chevesich, who co-authored a research paper about the lake, stated that the population growth, the purchase of water rights and drought resulted with the drying of the lake. In 2010, plantations and large estates purchased the water rights–water is recognized as private property in Chile following the Augusto Pinochet dictatorship–of tributaries feeding the lake and rerouted them for their own usage. The average annual rainfall in the region dropped from 350 mm/y in the 1980s to less than half that in the 2010s. In 2011 the lagoon was 12 km2 in size and 6 metres in depth. It disappeared entirely on May 9, 2018. Probable causes include a large influx of tourists, as well as using its waters for avocado cultivation, as well as increased water use by the nearby city of Paine and a longterm drought period since 2010, which is partially due to global warming.

Reclamation 
Reclamation projects are promoted to identify solutions for long-term recovery, especially voluntary watershed management agreements that will allow the rational and sustainable use of this resource. Since the lake derives much of its inflow from surface streams the need to keep or grow healthy forest cover in its watershed to act as a humidity storage has been deemed important for the lake's recovery. An eventual recovery of a permanent water surface would require various years of precipitation surplus.

See also
Drought in Chile
Petorca water crisis

References

External links 
La laguna Aculeo, antes atractivo de Chile, seca por completo (video, Spanish)
Lucas Cifuentes, Nicole Kramm: Chile se va secando: Aculeo está muerto. eldesconcierto.cl, 18. Februar 2019 (Spanish)
Philipp Reeves: In Chile, Many Regard Climate Change As The Greatest External Threat. NPR, 16. Juli 2017 (audio, 7:42 mins)

Lagoons of Chile
Landforms of Santiago Metropolitan Region
Former bodies of water